Media center or media centre may refer to:

Audio-visual software and devices
 Entertainment center, a furniture housing electronics for media consumption
 Home cinema, also commonly referred to as a dedicated "home theater" or "home media room"
 Home theater PC, media computer designed for living-room or Home cinema use
 JRiver Media Center, a multimedia application for Windows computers
 Kodi, open source media center, cross-platform software formerly named XBMC and originally named Xbox Media Center
 MediaPortal Media Center, a free alternative to Windows Media Center
 Portable Media Center
 Sally Project, open source software, designed for touchscreen Windows machines
 Western Digital Media Center
 Windows Media Center, Microsoft PC software application for home theater

Journalism
 International Broadcast Centre at a major sports event such as the Olympic Games
 Independent Media Center or Indymedia 
 RSV Media Center
 Women's Media Center
 Women Media Center
 International Middle East Media Center
 San Francisco Bay Area Independent Media Center

Librarianship
 Hybrid library, an area storing audio or visual material rather than books
 School media center
 Civic Media Center
 Keio Media Centers (Libraries)

See also
 Media (disambiguation)